The Repulse-class ships of the line were a class of eleven 74-gun third rates, designed for the Royal Navy by Sir William Rule. The first three ships to this design were ordered in 1800, with a second batch of five following in 1805. The final three ships of the class were ordered towards the end of the Napoleonic War to a modified version of Rule's draught, using the new constructional system created by Sir Robert Seppings; all three were completed after the war's end.

Ships

Builder: Dudman, Deptford Wharf
Ordered: 4 February 1800
Laid down: December 1800
Launched: 11 December 1802
Fate: Broken up, 1821

Builder: Barnard, Deptford Wharf
Ordered: 4 February 1800
Laid down: September 1800
Launched: 22 July 1803
Fate: Broken up, 1820

Builder: Pitcher, Northfleet
Ordered: 4 February 1800
Laid down: August 1800
Launched: 27 February 1804
Fate: Burnt, 1926

Builder: Perry, Wells & Green, Blackwall Yard
Ordered: 31 January 1805
Laid down: April 1805
Launched: 30 August 1806
Fate: Sold out of the service, 1843

Builder: Perry, Wells & Green, Blackwall
Ordered: 24 January 1805
Laid down: April 1805
Launched: 24 January 1807
Fate: Broken up, 1823

Builder: Wells, Blackwall
Ordered: 24 January 1805
Laid down: August 1805
Launched: 23 May 1807
Fate: Broken up, 1820

Builder: Pitcher, Northfleet
Ordered: 24 January 1805
Laid down: August 1805
Launched: 19 August 1807
Fate: Sold out of the service, 1870

Builder: Pitcher, Northfleet
Ordered: 24 January 1805
Laid down: December 1805
Launched: 12 April 1808
Fate: Broken up, 1838

Builder: Woolwich Dockyard
Ordered: 15 February 1814
Laid down: July 1814
Launched: 15 October 1818
Fate: Burnt, 1840

Builder: Bombay Dockyard
Ordered: 7 March 1815
Laid down: April 1817
Launched: 28 December 1818
Fate: Sold out of the service, 1905

Builder: Pembroke Dockyard
Ordered: 17 November 1812
Laid down: February 1816
Launched: 26 April 1819
Fate: Broken up, 1872

References

Lavery, Brian (2003) The Ship of the Line - Volume 1: The development of the battlefleet 1650-1850. Conway Maritime Press. .
Winfield, Rif (2008) British Warships in the Age of Sail, 1793-1817. Seaforth Publishing. .

 
Ship of the line classes